Marco Dominic Dapper is an American actor and model, best known for his role Carmine Basco on The Young and the Restless. He moved to Los Angeles in 2003, where he has studied acting at Lesly Kahn, Beverly Hills Playhouse, and Baron Brown.

Filmography

References

External links
 

21st-century American male actors
Male actors from California
American male film actors
Male models from California
American male television actors
American male soap opera actors
Living people
People from Hayward, California
Year of birth missing (living people)